Edward Jenner Warren (1826 - 1876) was an American lawyer, state legislator, and judge in North Carolina. He served three terms in the North Carolina Senate in the 1862, 1864 and 1870 terms.

He was a native of Vermont. He had a wife Deborah Virginia Bonner Warren (1829-1910), daughter Lucy Wheelock Warren (1850-1937) who attended Saint Mary's School in Raleigh, North Carolina from 1865 to 1867, and a son Charles Frederick Warren (1852-1904), who studied at Washington College (predecessor of Washington and Lee University) in Lexington, Virginia from 1869 to 1873. A collection of his papers and correspondence is extant. He corresponded with Thomas Sparrow.

See also
President pro tempore of the North Carolina Senate

References

1826 births
1876 deaths
North Carolina state senators
19th-century American politicians
19th-century American lawyers
North Carolina state court judges
19th-century American judges